Marián Adam (born 20 September 1981 in Ilava) is a Slovak football player who currently plays for ASKÖ Raiffeisen Gosau.

References

External links 
 
 Profile at sv-haitzendorf.at
 
 

1981 births
Living people
People from Ilava
Sportspeople from the Trenčín Region
Slovak footballers
Slovakia youth international footballers
Slovakia under-21 international footballers
Slovak expatriate footballers
FC DAC 1904 Dunajská Streda players
FC Metalist Kharkiv players
FC Steel Trans Ličartovce players
FK Dubnica players
MFK Stará Ľubovňa players
MFK Zemplín Michalovce players
MŠK Rimavská Sobota players
1. FC Tatran Prešov players
FK Pohronie players
ŠKF Sereď players
Slovak Super Liga players
Ukrainian Premier League players
Expatriate footballers in Ukraine
Slovak expatriate sportspeople in Ukraine
Expatriate footballers in Austria
Slovak expatriate sportspeople in Austria
Expatriate footballers in the Czech Republic
Slovak expatriate sportspeople in the Czech Republic
Association football forwards